Nomis may mean:
 Nomis (company), an Australian football shoe manufacturer.
 Nomis (moth), a genus of moths
 Nomis (film), a 2018 Canadian-American thriller film also known as Night Hunter
 Nomis, a service provided by the UK Office for National Statistics providing information about the British labour market
 Stéphane Nomis (born 1970), French judoka
 Syd Nomis (born 1941), South African rugby player